Glenn Murray Johnson (1922–2001) was a former player in the National Football League. Johnson played one season for the Green Bay Packers. Previously, he had played with the New York Yankees of the All-America Football Conference.

While playing Tackle for the Green Bay Packers, Johnson scored his sole career touchdown on December 11, 1949, on a fumble recovery in the end zone during the second quarter against the Detroit Lions.

Johnson finished his career with the Winnipeg Blue Bombers of the Canadian Football League, where he was an All Star in 1950.

References

1922 births
2001 deaths
Sportspeople from Mesa, Arizona
Players of American football from Arizona
Arizona State Sun Devils football players
New York Yankees (AAFC) players
Green Bay Packers players
Winnipeg Blue Bombers players